Dwayne Dolphin is a jazz and funk bassist.

Biography
Dolphin plays acoustic bass and bass guitar (including piccolo bass). He played locally in Pittsburgh from the age of 15. After high school he joined Wynton Marsalis's band. The AllMusic reviewer of his 1993 album Portrait of Adrian observed that "Dolphin's tone is round and full, and he's got an agile technique. Certainly the late Paul Chambers must have been an influence; like Chambers, Dolphin tends to place his unfussy improvisations in the instrument's lower register. Consequently, his lines are solidly melodic and generally to the point." Dolphin played piccolo bass on his 2006 album Ming.

Discography

As leader/co-leader
Portrait of Adrian (Minor Music, 1993)
Three Of A Kind, Madsen - Dolphin - Cox, (Minor Music, 1994)
Meets Mister T., Three Of A Kind, (Minor Music 1994)
4 Robin (AAM, 2004)
Ming (Bonedog, 2006)
Pretty Girl (Bonedog, 2008)
Essence of an Angel (Corona)

As sideman
With Geri Allen
Maroons (Blue Note, 1992)
With Arthur Blythe
Blythe Byte (Savant, 2001)
With Pee Wee Ellis
Twelve and More Blues (Minor Music, 1993)

With John Hicks
Something to Live For: A Billy Strayhorn Songbook (HighNote, 1997)
Nightwind: An Erroll Garner Songbook (HighNote, 1997)
Impressions of Mary Lou (HighNote, 1998)
Music in the Key of Clark (HighNote, 2001)
Fatha's Day: An Earl Hines Songbook (HighNote, 2003)
With Jimmy Ponder
James Street (HighNote, 1997)
With Stanley Turrentine
T Time (MusicMasters, 1995)

With Fred Wesley
Swing & Be Funky (Minor Music, 1993)
Amalgamation (Minor Music, 1994)

With Nancy Wilson
R.S.V.P. (Rare Songs, Very Personal) (MCG Jazz, 2004)

References

https://www.discogs.com/Nancy-Wilson-RSVP-Rare-Songs-Very-Personal/release/3903674

Living people
American bass guitarists
1963 births